Suriya is an inhabited place not identified as a separate place in the 2011 census, in the Sariya CD block in the Bagodar-Saria subdivision of the Giridih district in the Indian state of Jharkhand.

Geography

Location

According to the map of Sariya CD block in the District Census Handbook 2011, Giridih, Sariya seems to be a part of Barki Saraiya.

Area overview
Giridih district is a part of the Chota Nagpur plateau, with rocky soil and extensive forests. Most of the rivers in the district flow from the west to east, except in the northern portion where the rivers flow north and north west. The district has coal and mica mines. It is an overwhelmingly rural district with small pockets of urbanisation.

Note: The map alongside presents some of the notable locations in the district. All places marked in the map are linked in the larger full screen map.

Civic administration

Police station
Suriya police station has jurisdiction over the  Sariya CD block.

CD block HQ
The headquarters of Sariya CD block are located at Suriya.

Transport
Hazaribagh Road railway station is on the Asansol-Gaya section, a part of the Grand Chord, Howrah-Gaya-Delhi line and Howrah-Allahabad-Mumbai line.

Education
Sariya College was established at Suriya in 1984. It is affiliated with Vinoba Bhave University and offers courses in arts and commerce.

SRK DAV Public School is situated near Bagodih Suriya and affiliated with CBSE New Delhi. It has facilities for teaching from LKG to class XII.

References

Villages in Giridih district